Anders Peter Svensson is a Swedish record producer, songwriter, and musician. He is the main songwriter and guitarist of the band the Cardigans.
He started playing guitar at the age of eight, and in his teens he went on to play with local bands. After meeting bass player Magnus Sveningsson, they formed The Cardigans in 1992. Peter Svensson is credited with writing the music and melodies for almost all of the group's original songs.

In 1998, he released a side/solo project called Paus. All songs were co-written together with Joakim Berg from the band Kent. The drums were played by The Cardigans' drummer Bengt Lagerberg.
In 1999, the Paus album and Svensson’s work on The Cardigans' fourth album, Gran Turismo, earned him a Swedish Grammy as Composer of the Year.

Svensson co-wrote (again with Joakim Berg) Swedish singer Titiyo’s album, Come Along.
The single, "Come Along", was a big hit in 2001 and was awarded a Grammy for Song of the Year in Sweden.

Since the last album with The Cardigans, Super Extra Gravity, Svensson has written and produced songs for numerous international artists such as The Weeknd, Ariana Grande, Ellie Goulding and One Direction.

Production and Songwriting discography

References

1974 births
Living people
Swedish guitarists
Male guitarists
Swedish songwriters
The Cardigans members
People from Huskvarna
21st-century guitarists
Swedish male musicians